The women's synchronised 3 metre springboard diving competition at the 2006 Asian Games in Doha was held on 11 December at the Hamad Aquatic Centre.

Schedule
All times are Arabia Standard Time (UTC+03:00)

Results

References 

Results

External links

Diving at the 2006 Asian Games